The European Achievement in Fiction Series Award has been awarded annually by the European Film Academy since 2019. As a new category, the Academy introduces the European Achievement in Fiction Series Award, to reflect the changes in the cinematic landscape.  German series Babylon Berlin is the first recipient of the prize.  EFA chairwoman Agnieszka Holland said: “For younger generations, series are a much more popular format than theatrically released movies and if we want to remain relevant for our audiences, the EFAs need to reflect that.”

Winners and nominees

References

External links
 Nominees and winners at the European Film Academy website

Fiction Series
Awards established in 2019
2019 establishments in Europe
Television awards